Valdice (before 1950 Kartouzy-Valdice) is a municipality and village in Jičín District in the Hradec Králové Region of the Czech Republic. It has about 1,400 inhabitants.

Etymology
Valdice was named after the nearby deer park (from German Wald, meaning "forest"). It was also called Kartouzy after the local monastery.

Geography
It lies in the Jičín Uplands.

History

The village of Valdice was founded together with a Carthusian monastery by Albrecht von Wallenstein in 1627. About 20 houses were built for craftsmen working for the monks in the monastery. In 1782, the monastery was abolished by Joseph II. The prison in the premises of the former monastery was established in 1857 by Austrian Empire.

Economy
The Valdice Prison is the main employer in Valdice. It is classified as a high-security prison with a capacity of 1,023 prisoners.

Sights
The prison is located in the former Carthusian monastery, which was built in the Baroque style. Its premises are inaccessible. In the monastery complex there is also the Church of the Assumption of the Virgin Mary.

There is a Baroque statue of Saint John of Nepomuk from 1696.

Notable people
Jiří Stříbrný (1880–1955), politician; died here

References

External links

Villages in Jičín District